Much traditional Chinese art was made for the imperial court, often to be then redistributed as gifts. As well as Chinese painting, sculpture and Chinese calligraphy, there are a great range of what may be called decorative or applied arts.  Chinese fine art is distinguished from Chinese folk art, which differs in its style and purpose.  This article gives an overview of the many different applied arts of China.

Calligraphy

The Chinese imperial court collected calligraphy pieces from the most skilled calligraphers in the country. The collection contains many masterpieces made by well-known calligraphers throughout Chinese art history. Furthermore, because of calligraphy's high artistic value, calligraphy collecting was popular among several Chinese emperors in multiple dynasties.

Ceramics

Chinese ceramics, whose history originates back to the pre-dynastic periods, has continuously improved since then, and it is one of the most significant forms of Chinese art.

Snuff bottle

After opium was introduced to China, snuff bottles became popular. The Chinese royalties were addicted to them, as they used opium as a long-life medicine. The design of the snuff bottles flourished because of the money that the rich poured into the industry. Many of these bottles were made by talented artisans using tiny paints brushes; they were painted from inside of the bottle, reaching down from the top of the narrow neck. They are still highly collectible up to this day.

Cloisonné

Engraving

Glassware

Jewellery

Lacquer

It was during the Shang dynasty (c. 1600–1046 BCE) when the sophisticated techniques used in the lacquer process were first developed, and it became a highly artistic craft. Various prehistoric lacquerware have been unearthed in China dating back to the Neolithic period. The earliest extant lacquer object, a red wooden bowl, was unearthed at a Hemudu culture (c. 5000–4500 BCE) site. By the Han dynasty (206 BCE – 220 CE), many centers of lacquer production had become established. The knowledge of the Chinese methods focusing on the lacquer process spread from China during the Han, Tang, and Song dynasties. Later on, it was eventually introduced to the rest of the world—Korea, Japan, Southeast and South Asia.

Painting

Photography

After the invention of photography in 1839 and the arrival of European photographers in Macao, photography was soon introduced in several cities in China. At first, some people were reluctant because they thought that having the camera take a picture of them would result in their spirit being taken away. But, by the end of the nineteenth century, all major cities had photographic studios. Some affluent Chinese people even adopted photography as a hobby. Western and Chinese photographers documented ordinary street life, major wars, and prominent figures.

The Empress Dowager Cixi had her portrait taken repeatedly.

Sculpture and carving
In the 18th Century, a Qing dynasty covered vase depicting a woman holding a lingzhi fungus and a peony branch was created. The woman was also accompanied by a boy, a crane, and a deer as shown below.

Ivory carving

Ivory was not a prestigious material in the rather strict hierarchy of Chinese art, where jade had always been far more highly regarded, and rhinoceros horn (which was not ivory) had a special auspicious meaning. But ivory, as well as bone, had been used for various items since early times when China still had its own species of elephant. Demand for ivory seems to have played a large part in their extinction, which came before 100 BC. During the Ming dynasty, ivory began to be used for small statuettes of gods and others (see gallery). In the Qing dynasty, it suited the growing taste for intricate carving and became more prominently used for brush-holders, boxes, handles and similar pieces. Later on, Canton even developed large models of houses and other large and showy pieces, which remained popular. Enormous examples are still seen as decorative centrepieces at government receptions. Figures were typically uncoloured, or just with certain features coloured in ink which was often just black, but sometimes a few other colors.

Government seals
Seal knob (紐刻) is an art that originated in ancient China and is mainly popular in East Asian countries. It focuses or decorates on the head-part or the top-side of a seal. It is a kind of sculpture or mini-sculpture. In China, the utmost important seal of all is the imperial seal carved from the Heshibi, a sacred ceremonial jade. It was said that the green jade took the form of a round shape with inscriptions that read "Having received the Mandate from Heaven, may (the emperor) lead a long and prosperous life." (受命於天,既壽永昌) This was said to be written by the Primer Li Si for Qin Shi Huang Zhao Zheng, the Augustus Emperor of The Chinese Empire.

Ruyi

Ruyi is a scepter that serves primarily as a decoration. Its history began in the Qing dynasty when Ruyi scepters were given to noted visitors of the emperor. Now, they're given as birthday presents. Ruyi is made of different materials, including porcelain and jade. The term Ruyi means "may your wish be granted" or "as you wish". The unusual shape is meant to imitate the shape of a stemmed lotus flower.

Stone carving

Woodwork

Textile arts

Embroidery
Chinese embroidery is one of the oldest extant needlework. The four major regional styles of Chinese embroidery are Suzhou (Su Xiu), Hunan (Xiang Xiu), Guangdong (Yue Xiu) and Sichuan (Shu Xiu). All of them are nominated as Chinese Intangible Cultural Heritage.

Rugs

Woven material

See also

 Academies
 China Academy of Art
 China Central Academy of Fine Arts
 Hubei Institute of Fine Arts
 Chinese architecture
 Chinese Folk Art
 Chinese furniture
 Chinese garden
 Collections of fine art in China
 National Art Museum of China
 National Museum of China
 National Palace Museum, Taipei
 Forbidden City (Palace Museum)
 Summer Palace, Beijing

References

Bibliography
 Chang, Zonglin. Li, Xukui. (2006). Aspect of Chinese culture. 中国文化导读. 清华大学出版社 publishing
 Institute of the History of Natural Sciences and Chinese Academy of Sciences, ed. (1983). Ancient China's technology and science. Beijing: Foreign Languages Press. .
Rawson, Jessica (ed). (2007). The British Museum Book of Chinese Art, (2nd edn). British Museum Press. 
 Stark, Miriam T. (2005). Archaeology of Asia. Malden, MA : Blackwell Pub. .
  Wang, Zhongshu. (1982). Han Civilization. Translated by K.C. Chang and Collaborators. New Haven and London: Yale University Press. .
 Webb, Marianne (2000). Lacquer: Technology and conservation. Oxford: Butterworth-Heinemann. .

Chinese art
Decorative arts